Zoran Janković (born 8 February 1974) is a Serbian-born Bulgarian football manager and former player.

Club career

During his career, Janković represented FK Železnik, FK Vojvodina, PFC Litex Lovech, Dalian Shide F.C., Ethnikos Achna FC and FK Inđija. Janković was the highest scoring foreign player during the 2000–01 and 2001–02 A PFG seasons, managing 13 goals in each of them.

He has retired during winter break of 2010-11 season while playing for FK Inđija in the Serbian SuperLiga, becoming their manager.

On 15 September 2017, Janković became coach of the Thailand u-23 national team. He was sacked following Thailand's defeat in 2018 AFC U-23 Championship.

International career
Janković was capped 30 times for the Bulgarian national team, scoring 2 goals. He made his debut for the national side on 13 February 2002, in a friendly match against Croatia, which ended in a scoreless draw. Janković was also a member of the Bulgarian squad at UEFA Euro 2004 in Portugal. He was initially dropped following Hristo Stoichkov's appointment as manager in July 2004, but was recalled in 2006 and made a number of appearances in the Euro 2008 qualifiers. Janković is the second most capped non-Bulgarian-born player to appear for the team (after fellow Serbian Predrag Pažin) and is the second one to score a goal (the other one who has found the net is Marcelinho).

International goals
Scores and results list Bulgaria's goal tally first.

Honours
Litex Lovech
 Bulgarian Cup: 2000–01, 2003–04, 2007–08

Dalian Shide
 Chinese Super League: 2005
 Chinese FA Cup: 2005

References

External links

 
 Profile at Srbijafudbal

1974 births
Living people
People from Inđija
Serbian emigrants to Bulgaria
Naturalised citizens of Bulgaria
Bulgarian footballers
Serbian footballers
Association football forwards
Bulgaria international footballers
UEFA Euro 2004 players
FK Železnik players
FK Vojvodina players
FK Inđija players
PFC Litex Lovech players
Ethnikos Achna FC players
Serbian SuperLiga players
First Professional Football League (Bulgaria) players
Cypriot First Division players
Bulgarian expatriate footballers
Bulgarian expatriate sportspeople in China
Expatriate footballers in China
Expatriate footballers in Cyprus
Dalian Shide F.C. players
Chinese Super League players
Bulgarian football managers
Expatriate football managers in China
Bulgarian people of Serbian descent
Heilongjiang Ice City F.C. managers